The Columbia Mountains are a group of largely bare rock peaks, ridges and nunataks located near the east margin of the Dyer Plateau,  south-east of the Eternity Range, in Palmer Land. They were mapped by the U.S. Geological Survey in 1974, and named by the Advisory Committee on Antarctic Names after Columbia University, New York City, which for several seasons in the 1960s and 1970s sent geologists to study the structure of the Scotia Ridge.

Peaks
Mount Brocoum is the dominant peak on the eastern ridge of the Columbia Mountains.

References

 

Mountain ranges of Palmer Land